The rivière aux Brochets is a tributary of the rivière du Milieu, flowing in the territory of the city of La Tuque and in the unorganized territory of Lac-Masketsi (MRC of Mékinac Regional County Municipality), in the administrative region of Mauricie, in the province of Quebec, in Canada.

Geography 
This lake is part of the zec de la Bessonne.

  northwesterly, crossing lac Goulet and lac Cuisy, to the bridge located at the mouth of the latter;
  towards the south-east, cutting the Canadian National railway, crossing Lapointe lake, to at the mouth of Lake Albert that the current crosses over its full length; this lake is part of the Thiffault lakes;
  south-east, to the mouth of Lac aux Brochets that the current passes through its full length;
  towards the south-east, crossing Lac du Chat than the current crosses its full length;
  south-east winding to the confluence of the river.

The confluence of the Rivière aux Brochets flows onto the northwestern shore of the Rivière du Milieu, in the township of Carignan, almost at the limit of the township of Hackett. This confluence is located at:
  east of the northern bay of Mékinac Lake;
  west of the center of the hamlet of rivière du Milieu;
  northeast of the confluence of the rivière du Milieu.

Toponymy 
The toponym Rivière aux Brochets was formalized on December 5, 1968, at the Place Names Bank of the Commission de toponymie du Québec.

See also 

 List of rivers of Quebec

References 

Rivers of Mauricie
Mékinac Regional County Municipality